Azerizin is claimed to be a proprietary blend of the natural ingredients nicotinamide, azelaic acid, quercetin and curcumin that purportedly combine the anti-inflammatory and antimicrobial properties, along with inhibiting effects on sebum production.

The cascade of events in the inflammatory pathway that result from cell membrane disruption is well documented.  The release of membrane phospholipids leads to increased production of arachidonic acid which in turn results in elevated leukotriene, prostaglandin and thromboxane production. The ingredients in Azerizin are known to inhibit each of these three major paths of inflammation by blocking or down-regulating pro-inflammatory catalysts at multiple points in the inflammatory cascade, e.g., inhibition of phospholipase, lipooxygenase, COX-2, leukotrienes, thromboxane, prostaglandins, nitric oxide, monocyte chemoattractant protein-1 (MCP-1), tumor necrosis factor (TNF) and interleukin-12.

In addition to these anti-inflammatory actions, the components of Azerizin possess potent antimicrobial activity against Cutibacterium acnes and Staphylococcus epidermis, at least in part attributed to inhibition of microbial cellular protein synthesis.  
Azerizin was developed at Elorac for use as an adjunct in the management of acne vulgaris and rosacea.

References

External links 
 Evidence-based information about herbs, botanicals, supplements, and more, from Memorial Sloan-Kettering Cancer Center
 Complementary and Alternative Medicine Guide, from the University of Maryland Medical Center
 Management Options for Rosacea, from the National Rosacea Society
 Complementary and Alternative Therapies, from the National Psoriasis Foundation

Anti-inflammatory agents
Biologically-based therapies
Antimicrobials
Dietary supplements